David Gordon Speers (born 9 September 1974 in Inverell, Australia) is an Australian journalist and host of Insiders on ABC TV.

Previously he was political editor at Sky News Australia, as well as host of PM Agenda, The Last Word and Speers Tonight.

Career
Speers began his career in Geelong, Victoria in the newsroom of radio station K-Rock. Speers then worked at 2GB, 2UE and 3AW. He has been a member of the National Press Club board since 2005 and is currently a director.

Sky News 
In 2000, Speers joined Sky News as a political editor.

During his time with Sky News, Speers hosted the channel's flagship PM Agenda program Monday to Thursday afternoons. Additionally, he presented political updates and conducts interviews throughout the day on the 24-hour news channel.

He also previously commuted from his home in Canberra once a week to Sky News' primary studios in Sydney to host primetime program The Nation with David Speers before the program ended in 2015. On 28 January 2016, Speers began hosting a new weekly Sky News format Speers Tonight from Canberra.

ABC News 
In June 2019, Speers was appointed as host of the ABC's Insiders, replacing Barrie Cassidy from February 2020. Speers regularly appears on ABC News, News Breakfast and ABC Local Radio including Mornings with Virginia Trioli on ABC Radio Melbourne.

Speers is also a fill in presenter for Michael Rowland on News Breakfast.

Election coverage 
Speers was chosen to moderate the leaders' debate between John Howard and Kevin Rudd for the 2007 Australian federal election and again in the 2010 Australian federal election between Julia Gillard and Tony Abbott, as well as the 2013 Australian federal election between Kevin Rudd and Tony Abbott.

Other 
In 2020, Speers released the book On Mutiny which covered the removal of Malcolm Turnbull as prime minister.

Speers has also written regular articles for financial website Switzer.

Awards
Between 2006 and 2015, Speers has been awarded with an ASTRA Award for "outstanding performance" by a presenter or journalist every year with the exception of 2010. The awards were discontinued after 2015.

Speers won a Walkley Award in December 2014 for a notable interview with Attorney General George Brandis, in which Brandis struggled to explain what metadata was despite being the minister in charge of proposed new laws surrounding the storage and police access of metadata. Speers won the same award at the 2015 event (which Speers also hosted) for his notable "The Fixer" interview with Christopher Pyne on PM Agenda.

In 2016, Speers was named one of the 50 most powerful people in Australian television by News Corp Australia.

Speers won the Subscription Television Award for Best Male Presenter at the 2017 AACTA Awards.

Personal life
Speers' parents are Peter Speers and Robyn (née Cowled). He lives in Melbourne, and is married to Liz, with whom he has two children, born in 2010 and 2014.

Speers plays the trumpet and demonstrated this ability while hosting the 2010 ASTRA Awards.

References

Living people
Australian television journalists
Sky News Australia reporters and presenters
1974 births
Journalists from Sydney
Australian political journalists
Walkley Award winners
ABC News (Australia) presenters